Xylaria is a genus of ascomycetous fungi commonly found growing on dead wood. The name comes from the Greek xýlon meaning wood (see xylem).

Two of the common species of the genus are Xylaria hypoxylon and Xylaria polymorpha.

Xylaria hypoxylon, known by the common names stag's horn and candle-snuff fungus, is the most conspicuous because of its erect, 3–7 cm tall, antler-like ascocarps (fruitbodies) which are black at the base (where the perithecia are embedded) but white and branched towards the top, where the fruiting bodies produce white conidia (asexual spores).

Xylaria polymorpha, dead man's fingers, often grows in finger-like clusters from the base of a tree or from wood just below ground level. This is a primary fungus utilized in the spalting of sugar maple and other hardwoods.

Xylaria longipes, known by the common name dead moll's fingers, allegedly improves the quality of the wood used in string instruments.  It has not been linked to spalting of maple.

Species

Xylaria aburiensis
Xylaria acerata
Xylaria acuminatilongissima
Xylaria alata
Xylaria albisquamula
Xylaria albocincta
Xylaria albocinctoides
Xylaria amphithele
Xylaria angulosa
Xylaria anisopleura
Xylaria apiculata
Xylaria apoda
Xylaria arbuscula
Xylaria asperata
Xylaria assamensis
Xylaria atrodivaricata
Xylaria atroglobosa
Xylaria atrosphaerica
Xylaria avellana
Xylaria ayresii
Xylaria azadirachtae
Xylaria bambooensis
Xylaria bambusicola
Xylaria berkeleyi
Xylaria bicampaniformis
Xylaria bissei
Xylaria boergesenii
Xylaria brevicephala
Xylaria brunneovinosa
Xylaria bulbosa
Xylaria candelabrum
Xylaria carabayensis
Xylaria carpophila
Xylaria castilloi
Xylaria castorea
Xylaria chardoniana
Xylaria choui
Xylaria cinerea
Xylaria citrispora
Xylaria claviceps
Xylaria clusiae
Xylaria comosoides
Xylaria compuncta
Xylaria coprinicola
Xylaria coprophila
Xylaria cordovensiformis
Xylaria coremiifera
Xylaria corniformis
Xylaria cornu-damae
Xylaria cranioides
Xylaria crozonensis
Xylaria cubensis
Xylaria culicicephala
Xylaria culleniae
Xylaria cupressoides
Xylaria curta
Xylaria dennisii
Xylaria digitata
Xylaria diminuta
Xylaria discolor
Xylaria duranii
Xylaria enteroleuca
Xylaria eugeniae
Xylaria exalbida
Xylaria feejeensis
Xylaria ficicola
Xylaria filiformis
Xylaria filiformoidea
Xylaria fioriana
Xylaria formosana
Xylaria fraseri
Xylaria friesii
Xylaria frustrulata
Xylaria furcata
Xylaria galandii
Xylaria glebulosa
Xylaria gracillima
Xylaria grammica
Xylaria griseo-olivacea
Xylaria griseosepiacea
Xylaria guaranitica
Xylaria guareae
Xylaria guazumae
Xylaria guepinii
Xylaria hainanensis
Xylaria heliscus
Xylaria himalayensis
Xylaria hippotrichoides
Xylaria hypoxylon
Xylaria hypsipoda
Xylaria intracolorata
Xylaria intraflava
Xylaria jaliscoensis
Xylaria jolyana
Xylaria jiangsuensis – China
Xylaria kamatii
Xylaria karsticola
Xylaria kaumanae
Xylaria kretzschmarioidea
Xylaria lechatii
Xylaria lepidota
Xylaria liquidambaris
Xylaria longipes
Xylaria louisii
Xylaria luteostromata
Xylaria macrospora
Xylaria magniannulata
Xylaria magnoliae
Xylaria maitlandii
Xylaria mali
Xylaria maraca
Xylaria maumeei
Xylaria meliacearum
Xylaria mellissii
Xylaria memecyli
Xylaria mesenterica
Xylaria mexicana
Xylaria michoacana
Xylaria microceras
Xylaria minuta
Xylaria moelleroclavus
Xylaria moliwensis
Xylaria monstrosa
Xylaria montagnei
Xylaria mornandii
Xylaria multipartita
Xylaria multiplex
Xylaria musooriensis
Xylaria mycelioides
Xylaria myosurus
Xylaria myrosimila
Xylaria nigromedullosa
Xylaria obovata
Xylaria ochraceostroma
Xylaria opulenta
Xylaria oxyacanthae
Xylaria palmicola
Xylaria papulis
Xylaria papyrifera
Xylaria paulistana
Xylaria perezsilvae
Xylaria petchii
Xylaria pisoniae
Xylaria platypoda
Xylaria plumbea
Xylaria polymorpha
Xylaria polyramosa
Xylaria polytricha
Xylaria ponapeana
Xylaria potentillae
Xylaria praefecta
Xylaria primorskensis
Xylaria psamathos
Xylaria pseudoapiculata
Xylaria psidii
Xylaria pterula
Xylaria punjabensis
Xylaria queenslandica
Xylaria quercinophila
Xylaria ramosa
Xylaria ramus
Xylaria reperta
Xylaria reticulata
Xylaria rhopaloides
Xylaria rimulata
Xylaria rosea
Xylaria salonensis
Xylaria sanchezii
Xylaria scabriclavula
Xylaria schreuderiana
Xylaria scopiformis
Xylaria semiglobosa – China
Xylaria sibirica
Xylaria sicula
Xylaria sphaerica – China
Xylaria squamulosa
Xylaria stilbohypoxyloides
Xylaria stromafera
Xylaria subcoccophora
Xylaria symploci
Xylaria tanganyikaensis
Xylaria tectonae
Xylaria tenuispora
Xylaria terminaliae-bellericae
Xylaria terminaliae-crenulatae
Xylaria thailandica – southern Thailand
Xylaria theissenii
Xylaria thindii
Xylaria tischeri
Xylaria tolosa
Xylaria tuberiformis
Xylaria tucumanensis
Xylaria tumulosa
Xylaria umbonata
Xylaria uniapiculata
Xylaria vaporaria
Xylaria vasconica
Xylaria wellingtonensis
Xylaria wulaiensis
Xylaria zealandica

Gallery

See also
 Xylarium

References

Deacon, J. Fungal Biology. Blackwell Publishing. 2005.
Robinson, S. C. and P. E. Laks. 2010. Culture age and wood species affect zone line production of Xylaria polymorpha. The Open Mycology Journal 4:18-21.
Robinson, S. C., et al. 2012. Promoting fungal pigment formation in wood by utilizing a modified decay jar method. Wood Science and Technology 46:841-849. 
Robinson, S. C., et al. Methods of inoculating Acer spp., Populus tremuloides, and Fagus grandifolia logs for commercial spalting applications. Journal of Wood Science in press. doi:10.1007/s10086-013-1335-5

Sordariomycetes genera
Xylariales